This article seeks to serve as a field-guide, central repository, and listing for the flora and fauna of the US state of North Carolina and surrounding territories.

State ecology

North Carolina's geography is usually divided into three biomes: Coastal, Piedmont, and the Appalachian Mountains.

North Carolina is the most ecologically unique state in the southeast because its borders contain sub-tropical, temperate, and boreal habitats. Although the state is at temperate latitudes, the Appalachian Mountains and the Gulf Stream influence climate and, hence, the vegetation (flora) and animals (fauna).

Coastal region
Located in eastern North Carolina, the coastal region is much warmer and more humid. The climate is humid subtropical and the geography is flat coastal plain.

Piedmont
This region includes the Charlotte Metro Area and urban biomes of Raleigh and Durham, as well as a large area of semi-mountainous, rolling hills. The climate is humid subtropical and the geography is rolling, gentle hills and flat valleys. The Piedmont ranges from about 300–400 feet (90–120 m) elevation in the east to over 1,000 feet (300 m) in the west.

Mountains

The mountainous region has a climate of humid continental and its geography is the Appalachian Mountains with elevations between 1500 and more than 6000 feet.

Animal life

Mammals
 = Endangered

Opossums:
Virginia opossum, Didelphis virginiana
Armadillos:
Nine-banded armadillo, Dasypus novemcinctus
Rodents:
North American beaver, Castor canadensis reintroduced
Northern flying squirrel, Glaucomys sabrinus (Carolina northern flying squirrel, G. s. coloratus )
Southern flying squirrel, Glaucomys volans
Groundhog, Marmota monax
Rock vole, Microtus chrotorrhinus
Meadow vole, Microtus pennsylvanicus
Woodland vole, Microtus pinetorum
Southern red-backed vole Myodes gapperi
Woodland jumping mouse Napaeozapus insignis
Eastern woodrat, Neotoma floridana
Golden mouse Ochrotomys nuttalli
Muskrat, Ondatra zibethicus
Marsh rice rat, Oryzomys palustris
Cotton mouse, Peromyscus gossypinus
White-footed mouse, Peromyscus leucopus
Eastern deermouse, Peromyscus maniculatus
Oldfield mouse, Peromyscus polionotus
Eastern harvest mouse, Reithrodontomys humulis
Eastern gray squirrel, Sciurus carolinensis (state mammal)
Fox squirrel, Sciurus niger
Hispid cotton rat Sigmodon hispidus
Southern bog lemming, Synaptomys cooperi
Eastern chipmunk, Tamias striatus
American red squirrel, Tamiasciurus hudsonicus
Lagomorphs:
Snowshoe hare, Lepus americanus extirpated
Swamp rabbit, Sylvilagus aquaticus
Eastern cottontail, Sylvilagus floridanus
Appalachian cottontail, Sylvilagus obscurus 
Marsh rabbit, Sylvilagus palustris
Eulipotyphlans:
Star-nosed mole, Condylura cristata
Eastern mole, Scalopus aquaticus
Northern short-tailed shrew, Blarina brevicauda
Southeastern shrew, Sorex longirostris 
Bats:
Townsend's big-eared bat, Corynorhinus townsendii (Virginia big-eared bat, C. t. virginianus )
Northern yellow bat Dasypterus intermedius
Big brown bat, Eptesicus fuscus
Eastern red bat Lasiurus borealis
Hoary bat Lasiurus cinereus
Seminole bat Lasiurus seminolus
Gray bat, Myotis grisescens 
Eastern small-footed bat Myotis leibii 
Northern myotis, Myotis septentrionalis
Indiana bat, Myotis sodalis 
Carnivorans:
Coyote, Canis latrans
Red wolf, Canis rufus  reintroduced
North American river otter, Lontra canadensis
Bobcat, Lynx rufus
Striped skunk, Mephitis mephitis  
Eastern spotted skunk, Spilogale putorius 
Least weasel, Mustela nivalis
Long-tailed weasel, Neogale frenata
American mink, Neogale vison
Fisher, Pekania pennanti extirpated
Raccoon, Procyon lotor
Cougar, Puma concolor extirpated
Eastern cougar, P. c. couguar 
Gray fox, Urocyon cinereoargenteus
American black bear, Ursus americanus
Red fox, Vulpes vulpes

Even-toed ungulates:
American bison, Bison bison extirpated
Elk, Cervus canadensis reintroduced
Eastern elk, C. c. canadensis 
Rocky Mountain elk, C. c. nelsoni introduced
White-tailed deer, Odocoileus virginianus
Wild boar, Sus scrofa introduced

Birds

Reptiles

Amphibians

Frogs are common in the marshy and wet regions of the Piedmont. The frog pictured at left is a Cope's gray treefrog (Hyla chrysocelis) or gray treefrog (H. versicolor). These two species cannot be differentiated except by their call or genetic analysis. However, H. versicolor is rare in the state and likely to not be pictured here. They are most abundant in some northern Piedmont counties. Other frogs of North Carolina include spring peepers, Pseudacris crucifer or Hyla crucifer. Common among Carolina forests, this frog lives in high branches of trees, although it is also seen on the ground and commonly on roadways.

Some common amphibians in North Carolina: two-toed amphiuma, common mudpuppy, dwarf waterdog, eastern lesser siren, greater siren, red-spotted newt, Mabee's salamander, spotted salamander, marbled salamander (state salamander), mole salamander, eastern tiger salamander, southern dusky salamander, dwarf salamander, four-toed salamander, Wehrle's salamander, eastern spadefoot, southern toad, Pine Barrens treefrog (state frog), Cope's gray treefrog, green treefrog, squirrel treefrog, gray treefrog, little grass frog, ornate chorus frog, upland chorus frog, American bullfrog, bronze frog, pickerel frog, southern leopard frog and wood frog.

Fish
Freshwater: bodie bass, Roanoke bass, largemouth bass, rock bass, smallmouth bass, spotted bass, striped bass, white bass, blue catfish, channel catfish, flathead catfish, white catfish, brown bullhead, white perch, yellow perch, chain pickerel, redfin pickerel, American shad, hickory shad, pumpkinseed, redear, bluegill, flier, green sunfish, redbrest, warmouth, brook trout, rainbow trout, brown trout, garfish, bowfin, carp, crappie, freshwater drum, grass carp, kokanee salmon, muskellunge, tiger muskellunge, northern pike, sauger, eastern mosquitofish, smallmouth buffalo, walleye, the endemic Cape Fear shiner.

Saltwater: albacore, amberjack, Atlantic bonito, Atlantic tarpon, bank sea bass, barracuda, bigeye tuna, blackfin tuna, black drum, black sea bass, blacktip shark, bluefish, bluefin tuna, blue marlin, blueline tilefish, bull shark, butterfish, cobia, croaker, dolphinfish, flounder, gag, gray triggerfish, gray trout, hammerhead sharks, hickory shad, hogchoker, hogfish, humping mullet, king mackerel, knobbed porgy, lizardfish, little tunny, mako shark, menhaden, northern puffer, oyster toadfish, pigfish, pinfish, pompano, red drum, red grouper, red snapper, sailfish, scamp, sea mullet, searobin, sheepshead, silver perch, silver snapper, skate, skipjack tuna, spadefish, Spanish mackerel, speckled hind, spottail pinfish, spot, speckled trout, stingray, striped bass, swordfish, tiger shark, vermillion snapper, wahoo, white marlin, white grunt, yellowfin tuna, yellowedge grouper and yellowtail snapper.

Invertebrates
Various insects, jellyfish, millipedes, centipedes, freshwater crayfish and freshwater mollusks.

Spiders:
northern black widow (Latrodectus variolus),
southern black widow (Latrodectus mactans),
false black widow (Steatoda grossa),
common house spider (Parasteatoda tepidariorum),
yellow garden spider (Argiope aurantia),
leafy cob weaver (Theridion frondeum),
spiny-backed orbweaver (Gasteracantha cancriformis),
white sac spider (Elaver excepta) and 
orchard orb weaver (Leucauge venusta).

Mantises:
Carolina mantis (Stagmomantis carolina)

Hymenoptera:
European honey bee (Apis mellifera state insect),
American bumblebee (Bombus pensylvanicus),
eastern carpenter bee (Xylocopa virginica),
red paper wasp (Polistes carolina),
eastern cicada killer (Sphecius speciosus),
red velvet ant (Dasymutilla occidentalis) and 
red imported fire ant (Solenopsis invicta).

Odonata:
eastern pondhawk (Erythemis simplicicollis).

Lepidopterans:
monarch butterfly (Danaus plexippus) and 
red-spotted purple (Limenitis arthemis).

Plant life

References

External links
General interest:
North Carolina Wildlife Resources Commission
The North Carolina Gap Analysis Project -- Vertebrate Predicted Distribution Mapping
Carolina nature
Specific:
North Carolina Birding Trail
Herps of NC: Amphibians and Reptiles of North Carolina
the Savannah River Ecology Laboratory Herpetology Program
Butterflies of North Carolina
Common Spiders of North Carolina

 01
W01
.NC
W NC
North Carolina